All-star is a term designating an individual as having a high level of performance in their field.

All-star or All Star may also refer to:

Awards
 GAA GPA All Stars Awards, annual awards given to practitioners of Gaelic games
 Camogie All Stars Awards
 Ladies' Gaelic football All Stars Awards
 List of All Stars Awards winners (football)
 List of All Stars Awards winners (hurling)
 All Stars Footballer of the Year
 All Stars Hurler of the Year
 All Stars Young Footballer of the Year
 All Stars Young Hurler of the Year

Books
 All Star Comics, a 1940s comic book series
 All Star DC Comics, an imprint of comic book titles from 2005 to 2008

Film and television
 All Stars (1997 film), a Dutch sports comedy film
 All Stars (2013 film), a British dance film
 All Stars (TV series), an Italian television series
 Pretty Cure All Stars, an anime film series
 Project Runway All Stars, a spin-off series of Project Runway
 RuPaul's Drag Race: All Stars, a spin-off series of RuPaul's Drag Race
 Survivor: All-Stars, the 8th season of Survivor
 Total Drama All-Stars, the 5th season of Total Drama
 America's Next Top Model: All-Stars, the 17th season of America's Next Top Model
 Exatlón Estados Unidos: All-Stars, the 7th season of Exatlon in the United States
 All Stars - De serie, a Dutch television series featuring Jack Wouterse

Music
 All Star Records, a reggaeton record label from Puerto Rico

Artists
 All-Stars (band), a British blues group
 Allstars (band), a UK pop band
 Doug Anthony All Stars, an Australian musical comedy group
 Easy Star All-Stars, a reggae and dub collective
 Junior Walker & the All Stars, a 1960s soul group
 La Secta AllStar
 Ringo Starr & His All-Starr Band
 Louis Armstrong and His All Stars, a jazz sextet from the 1940s
 P-Funk All-Stars, a funk and soul collective featuring members of Parliament-Funkadelic

Albums
 All Stars (Jurica Pađen album)
 AllStar (album), a 2001 album La Secta AllStar
 Allstars (album), a 2002 album by Allstars

Songs
 "All Star" (song), a song by Smash Mouth
 "All Stars" (song), a song by Martin Solveig
 "All Star", a song by Ty Dolla Sign
 "All Star", a song by Lil Tecca

Sport
 All Star Wrestling, a British professional wrestling promotion run by Brian Dixon
 Ballymena United Allstars F.C., a British women's association football team
 All-Stars, an Australia Football League team

Video games
 Defense of the Ancients: Allstars, a custom map for Warcraft III: The Frozen Throne
 Blizzard All-stars, a working title for Heroes of the Storm
 Sega All-Stars (series), a series of crossover video games
 Super Mario All-Stars, a video game with four Mario titles
 Super Mario 3D All-Stars, a Nintendo Switch game with three 3D Mario platform titles
 All-Star, a playable game mode in the Super Smash Bros. franchise
 Nickelodeon All-Star Brawl, a 2021 video game developed by Ludosity and Fair Play Labs

Other uses
 Chuck Taylor All-Stars, a line of sport shoes by Converse
 All Stars, a miniature chocolate assortment by Nestlé

See also
 All Star Cashville Prince, American rapper
 The Amazing Race: All-Stars (disambiguation)
 Bad Girls All-Star Battle, spin-off series of Bad Girls Club